McGilvary is a surname. Notable people with the surname include:

Ailsa McGilvary, New Zealand bird conservationist and photographer
Daniel McGilvary (1828–1911), American Presbyterian missionary in Thailand
Evander Bradley McGilvary (1864–1953), American Presbyterian missionary in Thailand, son of Daniel

See also
McGilvray